Boomtown is a 1989 album by Andrew Cash. The video for the title track won the Juno Award for best video.
It reached #57 in Canada, August 14, 1989.

Track listing
All tracks written by Andrew Cash unless otherwise noted.
 "100 Years"  – 3:22
 "Boomtown"  – 4:10 (Angus/Cash)
 "What Am I Gonna Do With These Hands"  – 3:37
 "Sleepwalking"  – 2:35
 "These Days"  – 3:43
 "Nothing At All"  – 3:50
 "We Have Heard"  – 4:23
 "Wishing"  – 3:53
 "Times Talkin' Trouble Now"  – 4:30
 "Any Kind Of Love"  – 3:19
 "When The Rain Falls Down"  – 4:43

Personnel
Graydon Nichols – electric guitar, dobro, vocals
Glenn Milchem – drums and percussion
Paul Taylor – bass guitar, vocals
Jim Ediger – piano, Hammond organ, accordion, fiddle, vocals
Andrew Cash – vocals, electric and acoustic guitars

References 

1989 albums
Andrew Cash albums